The Western Bloc of the Revolutionary Armed Forces of Colombia was the smallest of the Revolutionary Armed Forces of Colombia's (FARC) blocs in size, although not in military capability. It was often held responsible for attacks that occurred in Cali and the surrounding area. The specific divisions of the group are arguable. Some of its divisions or fronts, as they were commonly known as, are shown below. Many of these fronts worked together at times towards a certain mission, while others were further divided into columns and companies with a smaller number of members. For more general information, see FARC-EP Chain of Command.

Commanders

6th Front 
The 6th Front was also known as the Hernando González Acosta Front. It was composed of 400 to 500 people as of 2011. It operated mostly in the Cauca and Valle del Cauca Departments.

On September 19, 2008, heavy fighting occurred between the Colombian Army and the FARC's sixth front during an attack on Toribío, Cauca Department. On April 27, 2013, 17 members of the front were captured while they attempted to steal a helicopter from the Colombian Armed Forces.

Mobile Column Alonso Cortés 
The Mobile Column Alonso Cortés, composed of up to 50 men, operated in the same area as the 6th Front.

8th Front 
The 8th Front was composed by up to 80 men and operated mostly in the Cauca Department and along the Pacific coast.

29th Front 
The 29th Front was composed of up to 250 men and operated mostly in the Nariño Department. It included the mobile column Daniel Aldana, which operated in the Tumaco area. In late April 2013, 13 alleged members of the column were captured.

30th Front 

Also known as the José Antonio Páez Front, the 30th Front was composed of up to 300 people. It operated mostly in the Cauca and Valle del Cauca Departments. The front led drug trafficking activities in the areas near the Yurumanguí River, and it was responsible for multiple attacks against civilians on Colombia's Pacific coast. In March 2011, 10 guerillas were killed by the army and 5 others were captured. On October 2, 2011, 3 guerillas were killed and 2 were captured. On February 11, the 30th front attacked an army base, killing 3 and injuring 18 members of the Colombian army.

Mobile column Miller Perdomo forms a part of this front.

60th Front 
The 60th Front was composed of up to 60 men and operated mostly in the Cauca Department.

Mobile Column Jacobo Arenas 

The Mobile Column Jacobo Arenas was composed of up to 300 men and operated mostly in the Cauca Department. The column is suspected of an attack which killed six soldiers on February 9, 2009.

Mobile Column Arturo Ruiz 

The Mobile Column Arturo Ruiz was one of the FARC's elite units, among its most notorious operations is the kidnapping of the Valle del Cauca deputies on April 11, 2002.

Mobile Column Gabriel Galvis 
The Mobile Column Gabriel Galvis operated in Valle del Cauca. It had 110 fighters or more as of 2011.

Mobile Column Víctor Saavedra 
The Mobile Column Víctor Saavedra operates in Valle del Cauca and, especially, in the mountains east of Tuluá.

Urban Front Manuel Cepeda Vargas 
The Urban Front Manuel Cepeda Vargas was composed by up to 50 men and was one of the FARC's strongest factions in Cali.

References

FARC